Wallace West ( – ) was an American science fiction writer.

Biography 
He was born in 1900.

He began publishing during 1927 with the story "Loup-Garou" in Weird Tales.  The majority of West's work, which was published prior to the 1960s, was short fiction.  His few novels, mostly published after World War II, were mostly re-workings of his pre-war short fiction.

He is credited with suggesting the plot to the Arch Oboler radio play Profits Unlimited (in Fourteen Radio Plays. Random House 1940).

Bibliography

Film history
Alice in Wonderland (1934)
Betty Boop in Snow-White (1934)
Paramount Newsreel Men with Admiral Byrd in Little America (1934)

Novels
The Bird of Time (1959)
 Lords of Atlantis (1960)
The Memory Bank (1962)
River of Time (1963)
The Time-Lockers (1964)
The Everlasting Exiles (1967)

Short stories
 "The Last Filibuster" (1967)

References

External links
 
 
 
 
 

20th-century American novelists
American male novelists
American science fiction writers
1900 births
1980 deaths
American male short story writers
20th-century American short story writers
20th-century American male writers